Masoom is a 1996 Indian Hindi-language romantic film directed by Mahesh Kothare. It is a remake of the 1994 Marathi film Maza Chhakula directed by the same director.

Plot
Kishan is the only son of Yashoda and Vikram Singh. Vikram is killed by a gangster Barood. A youngster named Akash, who is an investigating journalist. At any cost he wants Barood to be arrested and punished. Kishan gets kidnapped by Barood and from here on starts the roller coster ride of Kishan who cleverly comes out of Barood's web and at the end saves the country and makes his mother proud.

Cast 

Inder Kumar as Akash
 Ayesha Jhulka as Chanda
Omkar Kapoor as Kishan
Tinnu Anand as Hawaldar Bhim Singh
Renuka Shahane as Yashoda
Laxmikant Berde as Jeetu
Suresh Oberoi as Vikram Singh
Mohan Joshi as Barood
Sulabha Arya
Arun Bakshi
Sonali Arora as baby Sonali
 Rasik Dave

Soundtrack

Awards 
 Aditya Narayan won the Screen Award Special Jury Award in 1997 for his song Chhota Baccha Jaan Ke

References

External links 
 

1996 films
1990s Hindi-language films
Films scored by Anand Raj Anand
Hindi remakes of Marathi films
Films directed by Mahesh Kothare
Indian romantic drama films